The 2015–16 USHL season is the 37th season of the United States Hockey League as an all-junior league. The regular season ran from September 25, 2015, to April 10, 2016. The regular season champions, the Cedar Rapids RoughRiders, were awarded the Anderson Cup and the playoff champions, the Tri-City Storm, were awarded the Clark Cup.

Regular season
Final standings

Eastern Conference

Western Conference

x = clinched playoff berth; y = clinched conference title; z = clinched regular season title

Post season awards

All-USHL First Team

All-USHL Second Team

All Rookie Team

Clark Cup playoffs

References

External links
 Official website of the United States Hockey League

United States Hockey League seasons
Ushl